Joe W. Sanders (May 13, 1915 – June 8, 1994) was a justice of the Louisiana Supreme Court from November 7, 1960 to December 31, 1980, serving as chief justice from March 14, 1973 to December 31, 1980.

Born in Pleasant Hill, Sabine Parish, Louisiana, Sanders was raised on a family farm in Sabine Parish. He received a BA from Louisiana State University in 1935, and an LL.B. from the same institution in 1938.

He succeeded James D. Simon.

References

Justices of the Louisiana Supreme Court
1915 births
1994 deaths
Louisiana State University alumni
People from Pleasant Hill, Sabine Parish, Louisiana
20th-century American judges